Andreas Zeier Cappelen (31 January 1915 – 2 September 2008) was a Norwegian jurist and politician for the Labour Party. He was born in Vang, Hedmark.

He held a variety of positions in different Norwegian cabinets. He was Minister of Local Government Affairs in 1958–1963 in the third cabinet Gerhardsen, Minister of Finance in 1963 and 1963–1965 only interrupted by the short-lived cabinet Lyng, Minister of Foreign Affairs in the first cabinet Bratteli in 1971–1972, and finally Minister of Justice 1979–1980 in the cabinet Nordli.

As an elected politician he served in the position of deputy representative to the Norwegian Parliament from Rogaland during the term 1961–1965. On the local level he was a member of Stavanger city council in the periods 1945–1947, 1951–1957, 1967–1971 and 1983–1987, serving as deputy mayor briefly in 1953. He was also a member of Rogaland county council from 1966 to 1969. He chaired the county party chapter from 1956 to 1957.
 
Besides politics he worked as a lawyer and a judge, having graduated as cand.jur. in 1939.

With his brothers he was a member of Mot Dag in the 1930s.

References

1915 births
2008 deaths
Government ministers of Norway
Foreign Ministers of Norway
Ministers of Local Government and Modernisation of Norway
Deputy members of the Storting
Labour Party (Norway) politicians
20th-century Norwegian judges
Politicians from Stavanger
Andreas Zeier
Mot Dag
Ministers of Finance of Norway
Ministers of Justice of Norway